Notable people named Elizabeth Colbert include:

Elizabeth V. Colbert (1865–1929), an American politician from New York
Elizabeth Colbert Busch (born 1954), an American economist and politician from South Carolina

See also
Elizabeth Kolbert (born 1961), an American journalist